Lestidiops is a genus of barracudinas.

Species
There are currently 15 recognized species in this genus:
 Lestidiops affinis (Ege, 1933) (Barracudina)
 Lestidiops bathyopteryx (Fowler, 1944)
 Lestidiops cadenati (Maul, 1962)
 Lestidiops distans (Ege, 1953)
 Lestidiops extrema (Ege, 1953)
 Lestidiops gracilis (Ege, 1953)
 Lestidiops indopacifica (Ege, 1953) (Indo-Pacific barracudina)
 Lestidiops jayakari (Boulenger, 1889)
 Lestidiops jayakari jayakari (Boulenger, 1889) (Pacific barracudina)
 Lestidiops jayakari pseudosphyraenoides (Ege, 1918)
 Lestidiops mirabilis (Ege, 1933) (Strange pike smelt)
 Lestidiops neles (Harry, 1953)
 Lestidiops pacificus (A. E. Parr, 1931)
 Lestidiops ringens (D. S. Jordan & C. H. Gilbert, 1880) (Slender barracudina)
 Lestidiops similis (Ege, 1933)
 Lestidiops sphyraenopsis C. L. Hubbs, 1916
 Lestidiops sphyrenoides (A. Risso, 1820)

References

Paralepididae
Ray-finned fish genera